Alsophila sinuata, synonym Cyathea sinuata, is unique among the tree ferns in that it has entire leaves, not pinnate or lobed. It is native to Sri Lanka but rare, being only known from one local forest area.  It is one of the smallest species of tree ferns, growing only about one meter (3.3 feet) tall, with fronds 60 to 90 centimeters (15 to 23 inches) long.

References

sinuata
Ferns of Asia
Endemic flora of Sri Lanka